Yan Huaili (24 July 1936 – 12 April 2009) was a Chinese actor best known for his role as Sha Wujing in the 1986 television series Journey to the West.  Yan was a member of the Revolutionary Committee of the Kuomintang.

Early life
Yan was born in Fengnan District of Tangshan city, Hebei province, on July 24, 1936, during the Republic of China.

After the founding of the Communist State, Yan worked as an accountant in China Construction Bank in Qinhuangdao.

Career
In 1958, Yan entered in the Beijing People's Art Theatre, majoring in acting.

In the 1960s, Yan acted in Taking Tiger Mountain by Strategy, Red Crag and The Big Fisherman. During the Cultural Revolution, Yan acted in Cai Wenji, Wang Zhaojun and Aesop.

Yan rose to fame after portraying Sha Wujing in Journey to the West, a historical television series starring Xu Shaohua, Chi Zhongrui, Zhang Jinlai, Ma Dehua, Wang Yue, Cui Jingfu and Liu Dagang.  The series was one of the most watched ones in mainland China in that year.

In 1991, Yan played the character Cheng Pu in Romance of the Three Kingdoms, adapted from Luo Guanzhong's classical novel of the same title.

In 1993, Yan made his film debut in Wong Jing's Kung Fu Cult Master, playing a monk in Shaolin Temple, a film starring Jet Li, Sharla Cheung, Chingmy Yau and Gigi Lai.

In 2000, Yan appeared as Pei Yan, an official of the Chinese dynasty Tang Dynasty, in Palace of Desire.

In 2002, Yan participated in The Eloquent Ji Xiaolan as Chen Huizu, an ancient costume comedy television series starring Zhang Guoli, Zhang Tielin, Wang Gang and Yuan Li.

On April 12, 2009, Yan died of interstitial lung disease at Beijing Shijitan Hospital.

Filmography

Film

Television

References

External links
 Yan Huaili   

1936 births
2009 deaths
People from Tangshan
Male actors from Hebei
Chinese male film actors
Chinese male television actors
20th-century Chinese male actors
21st-century Chinese male actors